Závist is a municipality and village in Blansko District in the South Moravian Region of the Czech Republic. It has about 100 inhabitants.

Geography
The southern part of the municipality with the built-up area lies in the northern tip of the Bobrava Highlands, the northern part lies in the Drahany Highlands.

History
Závist was founded in 1776.

Transport
The I/43 road (part of European route E461) passes through Závist.

Sights
The main landmark of Závist is a belfry from 1833. Next to the belfry is a cross from 1857.

References

External links

Villages in Blansko District